48 Hours is an American documentary/news magazine television show broadcast on CBS. The show has been broadcast on the network since January 19, 1988 in the United States. The show airs Saturdays at 10:00 p.m. Eastern and Pacific Time, as part of the network's placeholder Crimetime Saturday block; as such, it is currently one of only two remaining first-run prime time shows (excluding sports) airing Saturday nights on the major U.S. broadcast television networks (along with Univision's Sabadazo). The show sometimes airs two-hour editions or two consecutive one-hour editions, depending on the subject involved or to serve as counterprogramming against other networks. Judy Tygard was named senior executive producer in January 2019, replacing Susan Zirinsky, who served as executive producer since 1996 until her early 2019 appointment as president of CBS News.

Reruns of 48 Hours are regularly broadcast on Investigation Discovery, the Oprah Winfrey Network and TLC as part of their daytime and/or weekend schedules, with varying titles based on the edition's subject matter (such as 48 Hours Hard Evidence, 48 Hours Investigates (a title that has also been used for the CBS broadcasts), 48 Hours on OWN or 48 Hours on ID).

Format

Original format
The program was created by former CBS News president Howard Stringer. It drew its title, inspiration and original format from the CBS News documentary 48 Hours on Crack Street, which aired in September 1986, centering on the drug crisis plaguing a number of U.S. neighborhoods. Like the original documentary, the program originally focused on showing events occurring within a 48-hour time span; this format was eventually phased out by the early 1990s.

One of the contributors to that program, CBS News correspondent Harold Dow, had been a member of the 48 Hours on-air staff since its premiere. Dan Rather, at the time also serving as anchor of the CBS Evening News, was the primary host of 48 Hours for its first 14 years on the air. In 1997, CBS aired a special episode of 48 Hours titled Property of 48 Hours, which focused on some of the stories over the program's first nine years.

After low ratings on Saturday nights, the show was moved to Wednesday nights, replacing the comedies Lenny and Doctor Doctor, and it was soon to be moved to the 10:00 p.m. slot.

Current format
In the mid-2000s, the program transitioned into its current format, originally known as 48 Hours Mystery although it has since reverted to its original title, which mainly presents "true crime" documentaries. On nights except Sundays where live primetime breaking news coverage from CBS News occurs, the timeslot of that coverage is branded as a special edition of 48 Hours, but is not part of the Saturday program's yearly ratings average and has little to no involvement from dedicated members of the 48 Hours production and on-air staff.

In 2009, the program featured interviews with Jodi Arias concerning the murder of her former boyfriend,  Travis Alexander. These recordings were later used in 2011 as evidence in court to convict Arias, the first time the program's interviews had ever been used in a death penalty trial.

On September 17, 2011, 48 Hours began broadcasting in high definition, making it the last prime time newsmagazine on U.S. broadcast television to convert to the format.

Variations

48 Hours Investigates/Mystery
The program was revamped in 2002, when Lesley Stahl took over hosting duties from Dan Rather, and its title was changed to 48 Hours Investigates. The title was changed again to 48 Hours Mystery in 2004, and with its single-topic format, it does not use a single host but is narrated by the reporter assigned to the story. The current format of the documentary primarily deals with real-life mysteries and crime stories, again with just one mystery per episode (such as the murder of Brian Stidham), owing to its heritage structure of featuring a single topic per episode.

The program is not confined to reporting mysteries; CBS often uses the 48 Hours title or timeslot to present mainly special reports on breaking news events only scheduled on the same day, such as a 2006 report on the fifth anniversary of the September 11, 2001 attacks, coverage of the Virginia Tech massacre in April 2007 or coverage of the Sandy Hook Elementary School shooting in December 2012. However, the relationship between these special programs and the rest of the program's editions are essentially limited to the program's title.

48 Hours: Live To Tell
48 Hours: Live To Tell uses a different format from the earlier versions of the program. This format does not utilize a narrator; instead the stories are recounted entirely by the victims and those who know the victims of crimes; some episodes also focus on other life-threatening situations, but are recounted in the same manner.

48 Hours: NCIS & NCIS: The Cases They Can't Forget
48 Hours: NCIS, also known as NCIS: The Cases They Can't Forget, utilizes a similar format to the standard, although it instead features real life cases from the Naval Criminal Investigative Service. Rocky Carroll, who plays NCIS director Leon Vance on NCIS, narrates these episodes, which aired on April 25, May 12, and May 23-June 13, 2017, all of which except for May 12 being on Tuesdays. As of 2018, it is in its second season.

On May 17, 2019, it was announced that the third season will premiere on May 29, 2019. For the third season, it was retitled NCIS: The Cases They Can't Forget.

Broadcast history and Nielsen ratings

International release
The series has also aired on various channels in Canada, most recently Global. Since June 2015, it has also aired in Australia on Network 10 (a sister network of CBS since 2017).

Awards and nominations
The program has received over 20 Emmy Awards, two Peabody Awards (one in 2000 for the report "Heroes Under Fire" and one for the reports "Abortion Battle" and "On Runaway Street"), and an Ohio State Award.

References

External links

1988 American television series debuts
1980s American television news shows
1990s American television news shows
2000s American television news shows
2010s American television news shows
2020s American television news shows
CBS News
CBS original programming
English-language television shows
Peabody Award-winning television programs
Super Bowl lead-out shows
Television series by CBS Studios
True crime television series